Charles Newton Reed (May 9, 1837 – March 25, 1926) was an American farmer and politician from New York.

Life 
Reed was born on May 9, 1837 in Clarendon, New York. His parents were assemblyman Horatio Reed and Jane Green. He moved to Bergen in 1845.

Reed attended Cary Academy and the Monroe Institute. He taught school in Trumansburg, and later worked as a farmer. He campaigned for John C. Frémont in the 1856 presidential election, served on the Genesee County Republican Committee, and was a captain of the Wide Awakes. He was also a Sunday school superintendent, and served as town supervisor of Bergen.

In 1891, Reed was elected to the New York State Assembly as a Republican, representing Genesee County. He served in the Assembly in 1892 and 1893.

In 1860, Reed married Charlotte A. Griffin. They had two sons, Herbert Griffin and Charles Louise.

In his later years, Reed largely lived in Rochester, but returned to Bergen in the winter. He died in his Bergen home on March 25, 1926. He was buried in the Rest Cemetery in Bergen.

References

External links 

 The Political Graveyard
 Charles N. Reed at Find a Grave

1837 births
1926 deaths
People from Clarendon, New York
People from Bergen, New York
People from Trumansburg, New York
Farmers from New York (state)
Town supervisors in New York (state)
Republican Party members of the New York State Assembly
19th-century American politicians
Politicians from Rochester, New York
Burials in New York (state)